A sârba or sîrba (Moldovan spelling) is a Romanian folk dance normally played in  or  time.  The word literally means "Serbian".

It can be danced in a circle, line, or couple formations.

It was historically popular not only in Romania, but also in Moldova, Serbia, Ukraine, Hungary, Polish highlanders (Gorals) and Ashkenazi Jews. It is fast-paced and triplets are usually emphasized in the melody. The sârba is still popular in Romanian traditional music and in Jewish Klezmer music. In Serbia its version is called Vlaski ("Wallachian").

References

The Book of Klezmer, by Yale Strom. 2002: A Capella books, Chicago

External links
 Sîrba Page  on Dunav balkan dance website (with example audio file)

Romanian folk dances
Moldovan folk dances
Circle dances
Jewish folklore
Klezmer